{{DISPLAYTITLE:C12H14N2}}
The molecular formula C12H14N2 (molar mass : 186.25 g/mol) may refer to:

 Altinicline
 Azepindole
 Detomidine
 N-(1-Naphthyl)ethylenediamine
 PNU-181731
 Tetrahydroharman
 Calligonine, a major alkaloid constituent of the roots of Calligonum minimum and the bark of Elaeagnus augustifolia
 (1S)-1-Methyl-2,3,4,9-tetrahydro-1H-pyrido-[3,4-b]-indole